On the Black Hill is a 1987 film directed by Andrew Grieve, based upon the novel of the same name by Bruce Chatwin.

Although Bruce Chatwin initially considered his novel about 80 years of rural family life in the Welsh border country unfilmable, he changed his mind when he saw how keen director Andrew Grieve was to make it and they went together to see some of the places and meet some of the people that Chatwin had been inspired by. Chatwin told Grieve to use the book for his film and make it his own.

Plot
On the Black Hill begins in the closing years of the 19th century with the marriage of dour, puritanical Welsh farmer Amos Jones (Bob Peck) to his social superior, vicar’s daughter Mary Latimer (Gemma Jones) after the death of her father (Mark Dignam). Her inheritance and social connections enable them to rent a vacant farm, 'The Vision', a situation that is a cause for resentment in their relationship. It is against this background, along with a boundary feud with Watkins, a malicious neighbour, that the twins Lewis (Robert Gwilym) and Benjamin (Mike Gwilym) grow up. Having come through
wars, romance and separation, they are still farming at 'The Vision' eighty years later.

Cast
 Bob Peck as Amos Jones
 Gemma Jones as Mary Jones (née Latimer)
 Mike Gwilym as Benjamin Jones
 Robert Gwilym as Lewis Jones
 Nicola Beddoe as Rosie
 Patrick Godfrey as The Auctioneer
 Catherine Schell as Lotte Zons
 Benjamin Whitrow as Arkwright
 Eric Wyn as Tom Watkins

Production
Bob Peck as the gaunt, wild-eyed Amos Jones dominates the early scenes, though he is well matched by Gemma Jones as his wife Mary. With typical thoroughness, Peck immersed himself in the part, learning to ride, plough and pleach hedges.

Although the film was made on a tight budget, the director had time to scout out appropriate locations in the area. "We spent far longer researching the locations than we would normally and it was the quality of the landscape and the discovery of the perfect farmhouse at Llanfihangel Nant Brân near Sennybridge which was critical to its success," said Grieve at a screening of the film at Borderlines Film Festival in 2006.

In fact, locations throughout the Welsh borders were used for the film, notably The Black Mountains, Hay-on-Wye and Crickhowell. Props and furniture for the film were borrowed from people and houses in the area and even the local WI was used to knit garments appropriate to the period. All of this firmly locates the film in its region and, as Grieve says, gives it a strong sense of reality. Grieve was brought up in mid Wales and so his understanding of the region and its people was crucial to the film’s atmosphere. The cinematography, by Thaddeus O'Sullivan, has been widely acclaimed.

References

External links
 

1987 films
British independent films
1987 drama films
Films set in Wales
British drama films
1987 independent films
Films directed by Andrew Grieve
1980s English-language films
1980s British films